Euselates cineracea is a species of beetle belonging to the family Scarabaeidae. This species is found in Thailand, Malaysia, Java and Sumatra.

References
 Global Species
 Encyclopedia of Life
 Organism Names
 Discover Life
 Universal Biological Indexer

External links
 Les Coleopteres

cineracea
Insects of Thailand
Beetles described in 1833